Store Svelmø is a small uninhabited Danish island in the South Funen Archipelago, lying southwest of Funen. Store Svelmø covers an area of 0.27 km2.

References 

Danish islands in the Baltic
Islands of Denmark
Geography of Faaborg-Midtfyn Municipality